The 2003 Potters Holidays World Indoor Bowls Championship  was held at Potters Leisure Resort, Hopton on Sea, Great Yarmouth, England, on 06-26 January 2003. Tony Allcock won his eighth pairs title.

Winners

Draw and results

Men's singles

Men's Pairs

Women's singles

References

External links
Official website

2003 in bowls
World Indoor Bowls Championship